Tegwared y Bais Wen ap Llywelyn (English: Tegwared with the White Mantle/Escutcheon, son of Llewelyn), Lord of Trefdraeth  was a natural son of Llywelyn the Great, Prince of Aberffraw, by a woman in some sources given as Crysten.  He was born circa 1210. 'The white mantle' refers to his coat of arms (as shown to the right).

Tegwared served as a General in his father's army and held the Lordship of Trefdraeth, Anglesey, where his posterity lived for the next 600 years. 

It is recorded that he was adopted and raised by Ednyfed Vychan, his father's Seneschal. Tegwared later married his daughter, Gwenlian ferch Ednyfed Vychan. They had the following children: 
 Howel ap Tegwared
 Angharad ap Tegwared
 Arddun ap Tegwared
 Tegwared Vychan ap Tegwared (b. circa 1250)

References

13th-century Welsh nobility
People from Anglesey
Welsh army officers